"I Wish" is a song written by Ed Hill and Tommy Lee James, and recorded by American country music artist Jo Dee Messina.  It was released in July 2003 as the second single from her Greatest Hits compilation album.  The song reached number 15 on the Billboard Hot Country Singles & Tracks chart.

Chart performance

References

2003 singles
2003 songs
Jo Dee Messina songs
Songs written by Tommy Lee James
Song recordings produced by Byron Gallimore
Song recordings produced by Tim McGraw
Curb Records singles
Songs written by Ed Hill